National Democratic Women's Union is a women's organisation in Nepal, politically aligned with the Rastriya Prajatantra Party.

References

Women's wings of political parties
Women's organisations based in Nepal